Van Horn is an unincorporated community in Skagit County, in the U.S. state of Washington.

History
A post office called Van Horn was established in 1901, and remained in operation until 1925. The community was named after James V. Van Horn, a first settler.

References

Unincorporated communities in Skagit County, Washington
Unincorporated communities in Washington (state)